Sankt Andrä im Lungau is a municipality in the district of Tamsweg in the state of Salzburg in Austria.

See also
 Salzburg
 Salzburgerland

References

Cities and towns in Tamsweg District